Fried noodles are common throughout East Asia, Southeast Asia and South Asia. Many varieties, cooking styles, and ingredients exist.

Fried noodle dishes

Stir-fried
 Beef chow fun – Cantonese dish of stir-fried beef, flat rice noodles, bean sprouts, and green onions
 Char kway teow – Chinese–inspired dish commonly served in Malaysia and Singapore, comprising stir-fried, flat rice noodles with prawns, eggs, bean sprouts, fish cake, mussels, green leafy vegetables and Chinese sausages.
 Chow chow – Nepali–style stir-fried noodles, often cooked with onion, vegetables and buff (water buffalo meat) and also widely eaten in India
 Chow mein – dish featured in Nepalese cuisine, American Chinese cuisine and Canadian Chinese cuisine, also a generic term for stir-fried wheat noodles in Chinese
 Drunken noodles (phat khi mao) – Thai dish of stir-fried wide rice noodles
 Hokkien mee – Chinese–inspired Malaysian and Singaporean dish, of stir-fried noodles with many variations in ingredients
 Japchae – Korean dish made with cellophane noodles
 Kwetiau goreng – Chinese Indonesian stir-fried flat rice noodles (kwetiau or shahe fen) with garlic, shallots, beef, chicken or prawn, chili, vegetables and sweet soy sauce
 Lo mein – American Chinese–style stir-fried wheat noodles
 Mee goreng - fried noodles common in the Malay-speaking communities of Malaysia, Singapore and Sri Lanka
 Mee siam – Malaysian and Singaporean dish of rice vermicelli in spicy, sweet and sour light gravy. Dry variations are also common.
 Mie goreng – spicy stir-fried yellow wheat noodles common in Indonesia
 Mie goreng Aceh – hot and spicy stir-fried thick yellow wheat noodles from Aceh province, Indonesia
 Pad thai – Thai–style stir-fried rice noodles with egg, fish sauce, and a combination of bean sprouts, shrimp, chicken, or tofu
 Pancit bihon – Filipino stir-fried rice vermicelli
 Pancit estacion
 Pancit Malabon
 Phat si-io – Thai dish of stir-fried wide rice noodles
 Rat na – Thai dish of stir-fried wide rice noodles
 Shanghai fried noodles
 Singapore chow fun/Singapore-style rice vermicelli – not actually from Singapore; Cantonese dish of thin rice noodles stir-fried with curry powder, bean sprouts, barbecued pork, and vegetables
 Singapore chow mein – same as above, but with wheat noodles
 Yaki udon – Japanese stir-fried thick wheat udon noodles
 Yakisoba – Japanese-style fried wheat or buckwheat noodles, flavoured with sosu (Japanese Worcestershire sauce) and served with pork, cabbage, and beni shōga; often served at festival stalls or as a filling for sandwiches

Pan–fried
 Hong Kong fried noodles– Hong Kong-style dish consisting of flour noodles pan-fried until crispy, and served together with vegetables, chicken or seafood

Deep-fried

 Fried crunchy wonton noodles – deep-fried strips of wonton wrappers, served as an appetizer with duck sauce and hot mustard at American Chinese restaurants
 I fu mie, Chinese Indonesian dried fried yi mein noodle served in sauce with vegetables, chicken or prawns.
 Mie kering, Chinese-influenced deep-fried crispy noodle from Makassar, Indonesia. Also known as kurum kurum in part of Pakistan.
 Mi krop – Thai dish consisting of crispy deep-fried rice noodles.

See also

 Buldak Bokkeum Myun
 List of noodle dishes

References

 
East Asian cuisine
South Asian cuisine
Southeast Asian cuisine